Joseph Edra Ukpo (6 June 1937 – 1 March 2023) was a Nigerian Roman Catholic prelate who was the Archbishop of the Archdiocese of Calabar from his appointment in 2003, succeeding , until his retirement in 2013. He had previously been the first Nigerian-born and black African bishop of the Roman Catholic Diocese of Ogoja, which is a suffragan diocese of the archdiocese of Calabar.

Ukpo was born at Okpoma in the Cross River State. He was the brother of Nigerian politician Anthony Ukpo. Ukpo died on 1 March 2023, at the age of 85. He died from a brief illness in Calabar after serving as a priest for over 50 years.

References

Further reading

External links

1937 births
2023 deaths
People from Cross River State
20th-century Roman Catholic bishops in Nigeria
21st-century Roman Catholic bishops in Nigeria
Bishops appointed by Pope Paul VI
Roman Catholic archbishops of Calabar
Roman Catholic bishops of Ogoja